Tijuana is a 2019 Mexican Spanish-language crime web television series created by Zayre Ferrer and Daniel Posada and starring Damián Alcázar, Tamara Vallarta and Rolf Petersen. The plot revolves around journalists in Mexico investigating Eugenio Robles's (Roberto Mateos) death and how it connects to Greorgio Mueller (Rodrigo Abed). The story is told with the reality of life in current-day Mexico as a backdrop, the world's most dangerous place for journalists.

It is a co-production between Netflix and the American Spanish-language free-to-air TV station Univision, and was ordered direct-to-series. The first season premiered on Netflix streaming and Univision on April 5, 2019.

Cast
 Damián Alcázar as Antonio Borja
 Tamara Vallarta as Gabriela Cisneros
 Rolf Petersen as Lalo
 Claudette Maillé as Federica
 Tete Espinoza as Malu
 Iván Aragón as Andrés Borja
 Rodrigo Abed as G. Mueller
 Martha Claudia Moreno as Lucía Torres
 Eden Villavicencio as Mejia
 Giancarlo Ruiz as Julian Sabines
 Andrés Delgado as Daniel Muller

Release
The full first season consisting of 11 episodes premiered on Netflix streaming on April 5, 2019.

References

External links
 
 
 

Spanish-language Netflix original programming